The  Laranjeiras River is a river of Santa Catarina state in southeastern Brazil.
It is a left tributary of the Hipólito River, which in turn is a right tributary of the Braço do Norte River.

The river rises in the São Joaquim National Park.
The upper reaches of the Laranjeiras River are fed by streams from the  Serra Furada State Park, created in 1980.

See also
List of rivers of Santa Catarina

References

Rivers of Santa Catarina (state)